Get Carter is a 1971 British film starring Michael Caine.

Get Carter may also refer to:

Related to the 1971 film:
Get Carter (2000 film), a remake of the 1971 movie
Get Carter (novel) (originally: Jack's Return Home), a novel by Ted Lewis; basis for the films

Television episodes:
"Get Carter" (ER)
"Get Carter" (Person of Interest)
"Get Carter!" (Robin Hood)

Music:
Get Carter (instrumental), sixth track on the album Dare (1981) by the Human League